Canary Wharf is an Elizabeth line station in Canary Wharf in East London, England. The station forms an artificial island in the West India Docks (North Dock). The five upper levels of the station are a mixed-use development known as Crossrail Place. Construction began in May 2009, and the station opened on 24 May 2022 when the section between Paddington and Abbey Wood stations began services. During the project's development the station was named Isle of Dogs, before the current name was adopted. The station was developed under a fixed price contract of £500 million with £350 million provided from the Crossrail budget and £150 million from the Canary Wharf Group with Crossrail spending an additional £80 million on safety improvements before it was opened.

The station is one of the largest on the Elizabeth line, providing Canary Wharf with a connection to the National Rail network and additionally an interchange with Canary Wharf station on the London Underground as well as Canary Wharf, West India Quay and Poplar stations on the Docklands Light Railway.

Design and construction
The station is located beneath and within the West India North Dock on an artificial island and extends from east of the Docklands Light Railway bridge to the east end of the dock.

Original design
The main access point for the Crossrail station was initially going to be the rebuilt Great Wharf Bridge. From this entrance there would have been a set of escalators to the concourse level, which would have been located underwater. Another bank of escalators would take passengers to the platforms.

Construction of the station was to predominantly take place on Hertsmere Road, which runs parallel to the West India North Dock. The construction including fit-out and commissioning of the Hertsmere Road shaft was expected to take approximately four years whilst the same would take five years for the station.

Redesign and construction
In December 2008 an extra £150 million of funding from the Canary Wharf Group was announced for the station with work due to commence in January 2009. As part of the deal Canary Wharf Group substantially redesigned the station, incorporating a large shopping centre and a park above the platforms situated in the middle of the dock.

A ground-breaking ceremony for the station development was held on 15 May 2009.

On 11 February 2010 Sadiq Khan, then Transport Minister, activated pumps designed to drain nearly 100 million litres from the work site over the following six weeks.

A station 'box' was constructed in a dry environment in a similar technique to that used in the construction of the nearby Canary Wharf Underground station. Crossrail Place is the structure above the platforms and was partly opened on 1 May 2015. In September 2015, the station construction was completed and the focus has shifted to fitting the station screen doors, ticket machines and other things before the station is scheduled for opening.

The station project became the subject of a dispute between Crossrail and developer Canary Wharf Group after Crossrail chief executive Mark Wild said work was inadequate. The station "had to have a wholesale retrofit, particularly in the safety systems," and Wild said the station required an extra £80m to fix. Canary Wharf Group dismissed the comments as "an attempt to pass blame for the delays on Crossrail". Wild said: "The key issues [at Canary Wharf] have been the quality of the electrical installation [redacted phrase] and the extensive safety critical upgrade work that has been required." The work was completed and handed over in January 2022, ahead of the official opening as part of the beginning of services between Paddington and Abbey Wood on 24 May 2022.

Ownership
Whilst the Elizabeth line operates services and manages the station as a train operating company and forms a part of National Rail, all infrastructure is owned and maintained by Transport for London and not by Network Rail.

Services
Elizabeth line services began calling at Canary Wharf on 24 May 2022 and all services are operated using  EMUs.

The typical off-peak service in trains per hour is:
 8 tph to 
 2 tph to 
 2 tph to 

References

External links

 Canary Wharf station on Crossrail's website

Canary Wharf
Canary Wharf buildings
Railway stations served by the Elizabeth line
Railway stations in the London Borough of Tower Hamlets
Railway stations in Great Britain opened in 2022
Railway stations located underground in the United Kingdom